A Certain Sacrifice is a 1985 American drama film co-written and directed by Stephen Jon Lewicki and starring Madonna, Jeremy Pattnosh and Charles Kurtz. It was Madonna's first movie, filmed from September 1979 through June 1981, but not released until 1985.

A Certain Sacrifice is an independent-underground art film, shot on-and-off over two years in New York City on a low-budget of just $20,000. Madonna finished her scenes in late 1980.

According to some estimations, the video release sold 50,000 copies in its first week, and the film achieved a certain cult status among some of her fans and collectors by that time.

Plot 
Madonna plays the part of Bruna, a Lower East Side resident who lives with three "love slaves" (one woman, one man, and one trans woman). Bruna meets Dashiell (Pattnosh) in the water fountain in Washington Square Park and the two "fall in love". Bruna later tells her lovers she does not need them anymore, resulting in them attacking her sexually. Later, Bruna is raped by Raymond Hall (Kurtz) in a bathroom at a coffee shop. To exact retribution, Bruna enlists her love slaves and Dashiell to abduct the rapist. They dress up as prostitutes and lure him into a limousine. They lead him to a theatre where a Satanic sacrifice is performed. Dashiell later wipes Raymond's blood all over Bruna.

Production and development 
A Certain Sacrifice is a Super 8 film. It was made on a low-budget between $12,000 to $20,000. The film marks the acting debut of Madonna and the directorial debut of Stephen Jon Lewicki, an aspiring filmmaker. Various authors have regarded the movie as an underground art film.

Despite Madonna's second thoughts about having participated in this movie, Lewicki had nothing but compliments for her. One of his oft-repeated stories was how he "discovered" Madonna and was amazed that she hand-wrote a three-page letter for a part that did not even pay. She was only paid $100, only because she was short on her apartment rent and Lewicki paid to help out. In Christopher Andersen's 1991 biography, Madonna Unauthorized, Lewicki stated: "That woman has more sensuality in her ear than most women have anywhere on their bodies".

Actor Jeremy Pattnosh wrote and performed several songs in the film, including: "Certain Sacrifice" and "Screamin' Demon Lover". Years later, in a 2000 Channel 4 documentary on Madonna's early years (titled Madonna: Naked Ambition), her Breakfast Club bandmate Dan Gilroy recalled: "I did not like that fellow who made A Certain Sacrifice, I felt he was using them big-time [...] it needed a laugh-track, something".

Release 
In 1985, A Certain Sacrifice was released on video to capitalize on Madonna's fame, and in 1986, there were theatrical midnight screenings. Madonna tried to buy the rights from director Stephen Jon Lewicki, offering him $5,000 which later upped to $10,000. Unsuccessful, she then attempted to ban the film from being seen. Stephen Lewicki invited her to view it; Madonna was reportedly unhappy with the result. According to Lewicki, she had an expression of horror on her face and screamed "Fuck you" as she stormed out of his apartment.

The release caused controversy in the press at the time, due to its sexually explicit and violent content, obtaining an R rating. Writing for The Wall Street Journal, Julie Salamon expressed: [...] Kind of a long MTV video with thinly developed themes of sadomasochism and ritual violence".

Sales
Edited in an one-inch video to further visually obscure it, the video release of A Certain Sacrifice sold more than 50,000 copies in its first week. According to biographer Andy Koopmans, in Madonna (2003), critics said that Madonna's appearance in the film was the only reason it sold well, while Mark Bego commented it was purchased by hard-core Madonna devotees alone. According to Billboard in 1985, Virgin Video, a joint venture of two independent distributors, had plans to distribute over one million copies of the video release by the end of 1985. In 2020, Nick Levine from The Daily Telegraph explained that Taraborrelli claims the film made Lewicki a "millionaire" in 1985. Lewicki once claimed that he deserved the financial success that came afterward, because he had taken a risk by casting an unknown Madonna, and the money he put into the movie. Despite most viewers labeled the film a failure, it also garnered cult status among some of Madonna's audience and collectors by that time of release.

References

Book sources

External links 
 
 

1985 films
1985 drama films
American drama films
American independent films
Films shot in New York City
American rape and revenge films
Films about Satanism
Teensploitation
1980s English-language films
1980s American films